Robert Douglas Heaton (July 1, 1873 – June 11, 1933) was a Republican member of the U.S. House of Representatives from Pennsylvania.

Biography
Robert D. Heaton was born in Raven Run, Pennsylvania. He moved to Ashland, Pennsylvania, with his parents in 1886. He attended the Canandaigua Academy in Canandaigua, New York, the New York Military Academy at Cornwall, New York, and the University of Pennsylvania at Philadelphia. He is identified with many business enterprises of the State and county.

Heaton was an unsuccessful candidate for election in 1910, and was elected as a Republican to the Sixty-fourth and Sixty-fifth Congresses. He did not seek renomination in 1918, having become a candidate for the Pennsylvania State Senate.

He was a member of the State Senate from 1919 to 1932.  He resumed his former business activities, and served as a member of the board of trustees of the Ashland State Hospital. He died at Ashland, aged 59.

Interment in the family cemetery at Mauch Chunk, Pennsylvania.

Sources

The Political Graveyard

1873 births
1933 deaths
Republican Party Pennsylvania state senators
People from Ashland, Pennsylvania
University of Pennsylvania alumni
New York Military Academy alumni
Republican Party members of the United States House of Representatives from Pennsylvania